It's Showtime 2012 in Leeuwarden or It's Showtime 54 & 55 was a kickboxing event held on January 28, 2012, at the WTC Expo in Leeuwarden, Netherlands.

Background
The event featured world title fight for It's Showtime World Heavyweight Championship of Hesdy Gerges vs. Daniel Ghiță, world title fight for It's Showtime World 73MAX Championship of Yohan Lidon vs. L'houcine Ouzgni and the last fight of Badr Hari vs. Gökhan Saki.

Results

References

It's Showtime (kickboxing) events
2012 in kickboxing